The Order of Charity, sometimes referred to as the Order of the Chefakat, was an order of the Ottoman Empire founded in 1878 by Sultan Abdul Hamid II. 

It was bestowed on selected women for distinguished humanitarian or charitable works, or as a token of the Sultan's esteem. Recipients included non-Ottoman citizens, including the English painter Margaret Murray Cookesley for her portrait of the Sultan's son, Hariot Hamilton-Temple-Blackwood (1883), wife of the Earl of Dufferin who was British ambassador to the Ottoman Empire, 
and to American social reformer Ellen Martin Henrotin (1893).

The badge consists of a five pointed star in gold and crimson enamel, with a central gold medallion bearing the Sultan's cypher, surrounded by a green enamelled band with the words "Humanity, Assistance, Patriotism" in Turkish. The star rests upon a circular wreath enamelled green with crimson berries, the whole mounted on another star with radiant points. The decoration is hung from a star and crescent suspension, enamelled red. The order had three classes, with the highest class mounted with diamonds and other precious stones.

Recipients
 Princess Ingeborg of Denmark
 Alexandra of Denmark
 Alexandra Feodorovna
 Margaret Murray Cookesley
 Princess Elisabeth Sybille of Saxe-Weimar-Eisenach
 Helen Morgenthau Fox
 Hariot Hamilton-Temple-Blackwood, Marchioness of Dufferin and Ava
 Ellen Martin Henrotin
 Maria Christina of Austria
 Archduchess Maria Theresa of Austria
 Princess Victoria Louise of Prussia
 Wilhelmina of the Netherlands
 Zita of Bourbon-Parma
 Milena of Montenegro

References

External link

 The Order of Chefakat, presented to the Countess of Jersey (National Trust)

Charity
1878 establishments in the Ottoman Empire
Orders of chivalry awarded to heads of state, consorts and sovereign family members